"Superman" is a song co-written and recorded by American country music artist Donna Fargo.  It was released in December 1972 as the first single from the album My Second Album.  The song was written by Fargo and Eddie Sauter.

The song was Fargo's third consecutive number one on the country chart.  The single went to number one for a single week and spent a total of fourteen weeks on the country chart.

Chart performance

References
 

Superman music
Donna Fargo songs
1973 singles
Songs written by Donna Fargo
Dot Records singles
1972 songs